Richard Mór de Burgh, 1st Lord of Connacht (c.1194–1242, or 1243), was a Hiberno-Norman aristocrat who was Seneschal of Munster and Justiciar of Ireland (1228–32).

Background
Richard Mór de Burgh was born towards the end of the year in 1193 (and came of age in 1214). He was the eldest son and heir of William de Burgh and his wife (daughter of Domnall Mór Ua Briain, King of Thomond). Richard's principal estate was in the barony of Loughrea where he built a castle in 1236 and a town was founded. He also founded Galway town and Ballinasloe. The islands on Lough Mask and Lough Orben were also part of his demesne.

From the death of his father (1206) until he reached his majority and received his inheritance (1214), Richard was a ward of the crown of England. In 1215 he briefly served in the household of his uncle, Hubert de Burgh, Earl of Kent. In 1223 (and again in 1225) he was appointed Seneschal of Munster and keeper of Limerick Castle.

Connacht
In 1224, Richard claimed Connacht (which had been granted to his father but never, in fact, conquered by him): he asserted that the grant to the Gaelic king Cathal Crobdearg Ua Conchobair (after William de Burgh's death in 1206), had been on condition of faithful service and that the king's son, Aedh mac Cathal Crobdearg Ua Conchobair (who succeeded that year) had forfeited it. Richard had the favour of his uncle, Hubert, justiciar of England, and was later awarded Connacht (May 1227). Having been given custody of the counties of Cork and Waterford and all the crown lands of Decies and Desmond, he was appointed Justiciar of Ireland (1228–32). In 1230 he was able to send the King 2000 marks, the proceeds of a tax of one-sixteenth on ecclesiastical benefices.

When, in 1232, his uncle Hubert's fell from grace, Richard was able to distance himself and avoid being campaigned against by Henry III. It was only in 1235, when he summoned the whole feudal host of the English lords and magnates to aid him, that he finally expelled the Gaelic king, Felim mac Cathal Crobderg Ua Conchobair, from Connacht. Richard and his lieutenants received great shares of land, while Felim was obliged to pay homage and was allowed to hold only five cantreds (in Roscommon), while Richard held the remaining 25 cantreds of Connacht in chief of the crown of England. De Burgh took the title of "Lord of Connacht".

Wife and children
Before 21 April 1225, he married Egidia de Lacy (daughter of Walter de Lacy and his wife Margaret de Braose), with which alliance he acquired the cantred of Eóghanacht Caisil with the castle of Ardmayle in Tipperary. Richard and Egidia had three sons and four daughters:

 Sir Richard de Burgh (d.1248), Lord of Connaught, Constable of Montgomery Castle married a relative of Eleanor of Provence, and died (without issue) in Poitou.
 Walter de Burgh, 1st Earl of Ulster (d.1271), Lord of Connaught.
 William Óg de Burgh (d.1270), the ancestor of the Earls of Clanricarde and Mac William family.
 Alice de Burgh married Muirchertach O Briain.
 Margery de Burgh (d. after March 1253) married Theobald Butler, 3rd Chief Butler of Ireland.
 Matilda de Burgh married Sir Gerald de Prendergast of Beauvoir; they had a daughter, Maud.
 Daughter de Burgh who married Hamon de Valoynes; they had a daughter, Mabel de Valoynes.

Richard de Burgh died shortly before 17 February 1243.

Ancestry

Notes

{{Reflist|2|refs=
 A New History of Ireland, volume IX, Oxford, 1984;
 Earls of Ulster and Lords of Connacht, 1205–1460 (De Burgh, De Lacy and Mortimer), p. 170;
 Mac William Burkes: Mac William Iochtar (de Burgh), Lords of Lower Connacht and Viscounts of Mayo, 1332–1649, p. 171;
 Burke of Clanricard: Mac William Uachtar (de Burgh), Lords of Upper Connacht and Earls of Clanricard, 1332–1722.
</ref>
}}

References
 Ancestral Roots of Certain American Colonists Who Came to America Before 1700 by Frederick Lewis Weis; Lines 73-30, 177B-8, 177B-9.
 The Tribes and customs of Hy-Many, John O'Donovan, 1843
 The Surnames of Ireland, Edward MacLysaght, Dublin, 1978.
 The Anglo-Normans in Co. Galway: the process of colonisation, Patrick Holland, Journal of the Galway Archaeological and Historical Society, vol. 41,(1987–88)
 Excavation on the line of the medieval town defences of Loughrea, Co. Galway, J.G.A.& H.S., vol. 41, (1987–88)
 Anglo-Norman Galway; rectangular earthworks and moated sites, Patrick Holland, J.G.A. & H.S., vol. 46 (1993)
  Rindown Castle: a royal fortress in Co. Roscommon, Sheelagh Harbison, J.G.A. & H.S., vol. 47 (1995)
 The Anglo-Norman landscape in County Galway; land-holdings, castles and settlements, Patrick Holland, J.G.A.& H.S., vol. 49 (1997)
 Annals of Ulster at CELT: Corpus of Electronic Texts at University College Cork
 Annals of Tigernach'' at CELT: Corpus of Electronic Texts at University College Cork
Revised edition of McCarthy's synchronisms at Trinity College Dublin.

Secondary sources

Nobility from County Limerick
People from County Galway
Irish lords
1194 births
1243 deaths
Justiciars of Ireland
Richard Mor
Normans in Ireland
Lords Lieutenant of Ireland